Christopher II may refer to:
 Christopher II of Armenia, the Catholicos of Armenia 628 to 630
 Christopher II of Denmark (1276–1332), king of Denmark from 1320 to 1326 and again from 1329 to 1332 
 Christopher II, Margrave of Baden-Rodemachern (1537–1575), margrave of Baden-Rodemachern from 1556 to 1575
 Christopher II, Burgrave and Count of Dohna-Schlodien (1702–1762)